George Elliott Clarke,  (born February 12, 1960) is a Canadian poet, playwright and literary critic who served as the Poet Laureate of Toronto from 2012 to 2015 and as the 2016–2017 Canadian Parliamentary Poet Laureate. His work is known largely for its use of a vast range of literary and artistic traditions (both "high" and "low"), its lush physicality and its bold political substance. One of Canada's most illustrious poets, Clarke is also known for chronicling the experience and history of the Black Canadian communities of Nova Scotia and New Brunswick, creating a cultural geography that he has coined "Africadia".

Life
Clarke was born to William and Geraldine Clarke in Windsor, Nova Scotia, near the Black Loyalist community of Three Mile Plains, and grew up in Halifax, Nova Scotia. He graduated from Queen Elizabeth High School in 1978.

He earned a BA honours degree in English from the University of Waterloo (1984), an MA degree in English from Dalhousie University (1989) and a PhD degree in English from Queen's University (1993).  He has received honorary degrees from Dalhousie University (LL.D.), the University of New Brunswick (Litt.D.), the University of Alberta (Litt.D.), the University of Waterloo (Litt.D.), and most recently, Saint Mary's University (Litt.D). He taught English and Canadian Studies at Duke University from 1994 to 1999 and was appointed the Seagrams Visiting Chair in Canadian Studies at McGill University for the academic year 1998–1999. In 1999, he became professor of English at the University of Toronto, where, in 2003, he was appointed the inaugural E J Pratt Professor of Canadian Literature. Clarke has also served as a Noted Scholar at the University of British Columbia (2002), as a visiting scholar at Mount Allison University (2005), and as the William Lyon Mackenzie King Visiting Professor in Canadian Studies at Harvard University (2013–14); and, outside of the academic sphere, as a researcher for the Ontario Provincial Parliament (1982–83), editor of the Imprint (University of Waterloo, 1984–85) and The Rap (Halifax, 1985–87), social worker for the Black United Front of Nova Scotia (1985–86), parliamentary aide to Howard McCurdy (1987–91), and newspaper columnist for the Halifax Daily News (1988–89).

Clarke is a sought-after conference speaker and is active in poetry circles throughout Canada, the US, the Caribbean, and Europe. He is also a founding member of the music collective Afro-Métis Nation, which put out its first album, Constitution, in May 2019. The group derives its name from the artists' mixed Africadian and Mi'kmaq descent. Clarke has described the group's sound as "a mash-up of southern-fried blues and saltwater spirituals, with Nashville guitars, Mi’kmaw-and-“African” drums, Highland bagpipes and Acadien fiddles."

Writing career
Clarke is recognized both for his own oeuvre, which includes seventeen collections of poetry, two novels, and four works of drama and opera, and for collecting and promoting stories of African-Canadian writers and poets in anthologies and studies such as Border Lines (1995), Eyeing the North Star (1997), Odysseys Home (2002), Fire on the Water (2002), Directions Home (2012) and Locating Home (2017). His artistic influences stretch from Shakespeare to Miles Davis, from Ezra Pound to Pierre Elliott Trudeau and Malcolm X, and it is from the fertile contradictions and tensions between thinkers of all periods of history that Clarke's later work draws much of its power. His style, with its embrace of the vernacular, the rambunctious, the unresolved and the spontaneous, lends itself well to the bold, passionate performances for which he is well known. His poetic and academic careers intersect in their particular emphasis on the perspectives of the African descendants in Canada and Nova Scotia, especially the African-American slaves’ descendants who settled on the East coast of Nova Scotia, whom he calls "Africadian."  He writes that it is a word that he "minted from 'Africa' and 'Acadia' (the old name for Nova Scotia and New Brunswick), to denote the Black populations of the Maritimes and especially of Nova Scotia".

Some of his poetry has also been set to music by the a cappella gospel quartet Four the Moment.

He views "Africadian" literature as "literal and liberal—I canonize songs and sonnets, histories and homilies." Clarke has stated that he found further writing inspiration in the 1970s and his "individualist poetic scored with implicit social commentary" came from the "Gang of Seven" intellectuals, "poet-politicos: jazz trumpeter Miles Davis, troubadour-bard Bob Dylan, libertine lyricist Irving Layton, guerrilla leader and poet Mao Zedong, reactionary modernist Ezra Pound, Black Power orator Malcolm X and the Right Honourable Pierre Elliott Trudeau."  Clarke found "as a whole, the group’s blunt talk, suave styles, acerbic independence, raunchy macho, feisty lyricism, singing heroic and a scarf-and-beret chivalry quite, well, liberating." His poetry and scholarship, which address and challenge historic encounters with racism, segregated areas, discrimination, hatred, forced relocation and a loss of a sense of identity and a sense of belonging experienced by the Black populations of Canada, have earned him worldwide acclaim.

In his anthology Fire On The Water, Clarke uses a biblical timeline stretching from Genesis to Psalms and Proverbs to Revelation to present Black writings and authors born within a specific period.  These names reflect the Africadians’ and other Black peoples’ forebears and the first singers' own preferences for singing "the Lord’s song in this strange land." In his most recent book, These Are the Words, a collaboration with Canadian Poet John B. Lee, Clarke translates one of the nine books of the Bible's apocrypha into a vigorous English vernacular. It is a prime example of his wide and open poetic sensibility, in which the spiritual and the sensual have equally their part.

His intellectual contributions involve both his ability to combine literary criticism and theatrical forte and his continuance of the themes of cultural inclusiveness and Canadian iconic symbolism.  In his 2007 play Trudeau:  Long March, Shining Path, Clarke features his Liberal hero Trudeau (1919–2000) describing him as "the Shakespearean character: ...He’s a figure about whom it is almost impossible to say anything definitive because he is encompassed by so many contradictions but that’s what makes him interesting."  In presenting a multicultural Trudeau on the international stage, Clarke seeks to capture the human dimensions, the personality of Trudeau rather than his politics so as to  emphasize the dialogues among key characters and "show the people as people not just exponents of ideas".
In 2012 Clarke was given substantial critical recognition in a volume devoted to the body of his writing, Africadian Atlantic: Essays on George Elliott Clarke, edited by Joseph Pivato.

In his 2016 and 2017 collections of poems, the names of which, Canticles I (MXXVI) and Canticles I (MMXVII), are a reference to Ezra Pound's The Cantos and The Song of Solomon, Clarke puts famous thinkers, explorers and rulers of the 17th, 18th and 20th Centuries into a dialogue on slavery and heritage. Together, these collections make up the first part of a projected three-part epic. Canticles II: MMXIX was released in 2019.

In his time as Poet Laureate of Toronto, Clarke created the Poets' Corner at City Hall, and worked with the Toronto Public Library to create the Toronto Poetry Map, an electronic map of the city that marks all sites referenced in Canadian poetry, and presents the relevant lines to the viewer. He also founded the East End Poetry Festival. For these accomplishments and more he is credited with expanding the role and responsibilities of the Poet Laureate considerably. Clarke similarly expanded the role of Canadian Parliamentary Poet Laureate during his tenure, becoming the first to have his poems recited in the Houses and recorded in Hansard.

Family
Mr Clarke is a great-nephew of the late Canadian opera singer Portia White, politician Bill White and labour union leader Jack White. Clarke is a seventh-generation African Canadian and is descended from African-American refugees from the War of 1812 who escaped to the British and were relocated to Nova Scotia. Clarke is the great grandson of William Andrew White, an American-born Baptist preacher and missionary, army chaplain, and radio pioneer, who was one of the very few black officers in the British army worldwide during World War I. Clarke also has Mi'kmaq Indigenous ancestry.

Awards and merits
In 1998 Clarke won the Portia White Prize for Artistic Achievement. In 2001, he won the Governor General's Award for poetry for his book Execution Poems, as well as the National Magazine Gold Medal for Poetry. He has also won the Dr. Martin Luther King Jr. Achievement Award (2004), the Pierre Elliott Trudeau Fellowship Prize (2005-2008), the Dartmouth Book Award for Fiction (2006), and the Eric Hoffer Book Award for Poetry (2009).

Clarke was appointed to the Order of Nova Scotia in 2006, and to the Order of Canada, at the rank of Officer, in 2008.

On January 16, 2008 Clarke was made an honorary Fellow of the Haliburton Literary Society, the oldest literary society in North America, at the University of King's College, Halifax; and in 2009 he was a co-recipient of the William P. Hubbard Award for Race Relations from the City of Toronto for his outstanding achievements and commitment in making a distinct difference in racial relations in Toronto.  Clarke was chosen expressly for "his local and national leadership role in creating an understanding and awareness of African and black culture and excellence in his contribution to redefining culture."

In November 2012, Clarke became Toronto's fourth Poet Laureate.

In January 2016, Clarke became Canada's seventh Parliamentary Poet Laureate.

In 2018, thanks to a gift from Ms. Rebecca Gardiner, the George Elliott Clarke Scholarship Fund was established at Duke University.

His 2021 book J'Accuse! (Poem versus Silence) was shortlisted for the 2022 ReLit Award for poetry.

Bibliography 
"To Paris, Burning," In Constance Rooke (ed.), Writing Away: the PEN Canada Travel Anthology, McClelland & Stewart Inc., 1994.
 Kamboureli, Smaro (1996), Making a Difference: Canadian Multicultural Literature. Toronto: Oxford University Press, pp. 491
 Tracey, Lindalee (1999), A Scattering of Seeds: The Creation of Canada.  Toronto: McArthur & Company
  Africadian Atlantic: Essays on George Elliott Clarke. ed. Joseph Pivato. Toronto: Guernica Editions, 2012.

Poetry 
 1983: Saltwater Spirituals and Deeper Blues, Lawrencetown Beach, Nova Scotia: Pottersfield. 
 1990: Whylah Falls, Vancouver: Polestar,  (revised edition, 2000)
 1994: Lush Dreams, Blue Exile: Fugitive Poems 1978–1993. Lawrencetown Beach, Nova Scotia: Pottersfield. 
 1999: Gold Indigoes. Durham: Carolina Wren, 
 2001: Execution Poems: The Black Acadian Tragedy of George and Rue. Wolfville, Nova Scotia: Gaspereau Press, 
 2001: Blue. Vancouver: Polestar, 
 2001: Blue II, A Trestle Chapbook in Running With Scissors, Montréal: Cumulus Press, 
 2005: Illuminated Verses. Toronto: Canadian Scholars' Press, 
 2006: Black. Vancouver: Polestar, 
 2008: Blues and Bliss: The Poetry of George Elliott Clarke. Wilfrid Laurier University Press, 
 2009: I & I. Fredericton: Goose Lane, 
 2011: Red. Gaspereau Press, 
 2013: Lasso the Wind: Aurélia’s Verses and Other Poems. Illus. Susan Tooke.  Nimbus Books, 
 2013: Illicit Sonnets. Eyewear Publishing, 
 2014: Traverse. Exile Editions, 
 2015: Extra Illicit Sonnets. Exile Editions, 
 2016: Gold. Gaspereau Press, 
 2016: Canticles I (MMXVI). Guernica Editions, 
 2017: Canticles I (MMXVII). Guernica Editions, 
 2017: The Merchant of Venice (Retried). Kentville, Nova Scotia: Gaspereau Press.
 2018: These Are the Words. Collaboration with John B. Lee. Hidden Book Press, 
2019: Portia White: A Portrait in Words. Nimbus Publishing, 
2021: J'Accuse! (Poem versus Silence)

Plays 

 1999: Whylah Falls: The Play. Toronto: Playwrights Canada, 
 1999: Beatrice Chancy. Vancouver: Polestar, 
 2003: Québécité. Wolfville, Nova Scotia, Gaspereau Press, 
 2007: Trudeau: Long March, Shining Path. Kentville, Nova Scotia: Gaspereau Press,

Novels 
 2005: George and Rue. Toronto: HarperCollins,  / 
 2016: The Motorcyclist. Toronto: HarperCollins

Memoir
 2021: Where Beauty Survived

Anthologies edited 
 1991: Fire on the Water: An Anthology of Black Nova Scotian Writing, Volume One. Lawrencetown Beach, Nova Scotia: Pottersfield, 
 1992: Fire on the Water: An Anthology of Black Nova Scotian Writing, Volume Two. Lawrencetown Beach, Nova Scotia: Pottersfield, 
 1995: Border Lines: Contemporary Poems in English. Edited by J.A. Wainwright, George Elliot Clarke and others. Mississauga, Ont.: Copp Clark, 1995. 
 1997: Eyeing the North Star: Directions in African-Canadian Literature. Toronto: McClelland & Stewart, 1997 
 2018: Locating Home: The First African-Canadian Novel and Verse Collections. Tightrope Books, 2018.

Criticism 
 2002: Odysseys Home: Mapping African-Canadian Literature. Toronto: University of Toronto Press, 
 2011: Directions Home: Approaches to African-Canadian Literature. Toronto: University of Toronto Press,

Awards
 1979: Honourable Mention, Atlantic Writing Competition (Adult Poetry), Writers' Federation of Nova Scotia
 1981: First Prize, Atlantic Writing Competition (Adult Poetry), Writers' Federation of Nova Scotia
 1983: Second Prize, Bliss Carman Poetry Award, Banff Centre
 1991: Archibald Lampman Award for Poetry, Ottawa Independent Writers
 1998: Portia White Prize, Nova Scotia Arts Council
 1998: Bellagio Center Fellow, Rockefeller Foundation, New York City
 1999: Alumni Achievement Award, University of Waterloo
 2002: Governor General's Award for Poetry, for Execution Poems
 National Magazine Gold Award for Poetry
 2004: Martin Luther King Jr. Achievement Award, Black Theatre Workshop
 2006: Pierre Elliott Trudeau Fellowship Prize, Pierre Elliott Trudeau Foundation
 2006: Dartmouth Book Award for Fiction
 2006: Frontieras Poesis Premuil [Prize], Poesis Magazine, International Poetry Festival, Satu Mare, Romania
 2006: Order of Nova Scotia
 2007: Longlisted for the International Dublin Literary Award, for George and Rue
 2008: Officer of the Order of Canada
 2009: Shortlisted, Dartmouth Book Award for Fiction
 2010: Shortlisted, Acorn-Plantos Award for People's Poetry
 2012: Honorary Doctor of Letters degree from Acadia University
 2012: Queen Elizabeth II Diamond Jubilee Medal
 2012: Excellence in the Arts Award (Canadian Civil Liberties Association)
 2012: Appointed by the Toronto City Council to the post of Poet Laureate of Toronto
 2016: Appointed by The Parliament of Canada to the post of Canadian Parliamentary Poet Laureate
 2017: Lifetime Achievement Award, Dalhousie University Alumni Association
 2017: Trailblazers Award: National Black Canadians Summit, Federation of Black Canadians & Michaëlle Jean Foundation
 2017: Elected, Fellow of the Royal Canadian Geographical Society

See also

Acadia
Canadian literature
Canadian poetry
List of Canadian poets
List of Canadian writers
 List of University of Waterloo people

External links

References

Further reading
 Nora Tunkel: Tracing the Lyrics of the Unvoiced: G. E. Clarke, in Tunkel, Transcultural imaginaries. History and globalization in contemporary Canadian literature. Winter, Heidelberg 2012, S. 169 – 178. = Doct. thesis, Universität Wien 2009

1960 births
Living people
Black Canadian writers
Black Nova Scotians
20th-century Canadian dramatists and playwrights
21st-century Canadian dramatists and playwrights
Canadian literary critics
Canadian male novelists
Canadian people of American descent
Canadian people of African-American descent
20th-century Canadian poets
20th-century Canadian male writers
Canadian male poets
Dalhousie University alumni
Duke University faculty
Governor General's Award-winning poets
Writers from Nova Scotia
Members of the Order of Nova Scotia
Officers of the Order of Canada
People from Windsor, Nova Scotia
Queen's University at Kingston alumni
University of Alberta alumni
University of Waterloo alumni
Academic staff of the University of Toronto
21st-century Canadian novelists
21st-century Canadian poets
Canadian librettists
Canadian male dramatists and playwrights
Poets Laureate of Toronto
21st-century Canadian male writers
Canadian male non-fiction writers
Canadian Parliamentary Poets Laureate